The Moscow Big Ring Road, designated as A108, is a Russian federal highway with a length of .

It is located in the Moscow, Kaluga and Vladimir Oblasts, passing through the cities of Orekhovo-Zuyevo, Likino-Dulyovo, Kurovskoye, Voskresensk, Balabanovo, Ruza, Klin and Dmitrov. The highway forms a large transport circle, in the center of which is Moscow.

References

Roads in Kaluga Oblast
Roads in Moscow Oblast
Roads in Vladimir Oblast
Ring roads in Russia